Karl Franz Emil von Schafhäutl (16 February 1803 in Ingolstadt – 25 February 1890 in Munich) was a German naturalist and musicologist.

He was professor of Geognosy in Munich. He was the author of Geognostische Untersuchungen des südbayerischen Alpengebirges (1851) and Der Gregorianische Choral in seiner Entwicklung (1869). He also studied mining and foundry practise.

Works
Geognostische Untersuchungen des südbayrischen Alpengebirges Munich, 1851
Südbayerns Lethae geognostica , Lipsia, 1863 
Die Geologie in ihrem Verhältnis zu den übrigen Naturwissenschaften Munich, 1843
Die neuesten geologischen Hypothesen und ihr Verhältnis zu den übrigen Naturwissenschaften überhaupt, 1844
Der echte gregorianische Choral in seiner Entwicklung bis zur Kirchenmusik unserer Zeit Munich, 1869
Ein Spaziergang durch die liturgische Musikgeschichte der katholischen Kirche Munich, 1887
Abt Georg Joseph Vogler, 1888 also Hildesheim ; New York : Georg Olms, 1979.

References
Wilhelm Ernst, Karl Emil von Schafhäutl (1803–1890). Ein bayerisches Universalgenie des 19. Jahrhunderts (Karl Emil von Schafhaeutl (1803–1890). Privately published Ernst, Ingolstadt, 1994
DBN

19th-century German geologists
People from Ingolstadt
1803 births
1890 deaths
19th-century German musicologists